Hillbilly Deluxe is the ninth studio album by American country music duo Brooks & Dunn, released in 2005 on Arista Nashville. Certified Platinum in the United States by the RIAA, the album produced four singles on the Billboard Hot Country Songs charts. The duo produced the majority of the album with Tony Brown.

Content
Hillbilly Deluxe was led off by the single "Play Something Country." This song was co-written by Ronnie Dunn, one-half of Brooks & Dunn, along with former McBride & the Ride frontman Terry McBride, who plays bass in Brooks & Dunn's road band and co-writes several of their songs. "Play Something Country" was the duo's twentieth and final Number One hit on the Billboard country singles charts. "Believe" and "Building Bridges" (featuring guest vocals from Vince Gill and Sheryl Crow), were released as the album's second and third singles, respectively, and both were additional Top Ten hits. The title track was the final single released from the album, and it reached a peak of number 16.

Production
Kix Brooks and Ronnie Dunn produced the majority of the album with Tony Brown, except for "My Heart's Not a Hotel", which Brooks, Brown and Dunn produced with Mark Wright. Brooks and Tom Shapiro co-produced the demo for "One More Roll of the Dice" (which they also co-wrote), while the demos for "Her West Was Wilder" and "She Likes to Get Out of Town" were produced by Brooks and Bob DiPiero, who also co-wrote those tracks with Brooks.

Track listing

Personnel
Compiled from liner notes.

Musicians

Eddie Bayers – drums
Larry Beaird – acoustic guitar
Mike Brignardello – bass guitar
Kix Brooks – lead vocals, background vocals, harmonica
Steve Bryant – bass guitar
Tom Bukovac – acoustic guitar
Lisa Cochran – background vocals
Perry Coleman – background vocals
J. T. Corenflos – acoustic guitar, electric guitar
Sheryl Crow – background vocals on "Building Bridges"
Eric Darken – percussion
Chip Davis – background vocals
Bob DiPiero – acoustic guitar
Dan Dugmore – acoustic guitar, steel guitar
Stuart Duncan – mandolin
Ronnie Dunn – lead vocals, background vocals
Shannon Forrest – drums
Larry Franklin – mandolin
Vince Gill – background vocals on "Building Bridges"
Kenny Greenberg – electric guitar, National guitar
David Grissom – electric guitar
Tony Harrell – piano, keyboards
Steve Herrmann – trumpet
Wes Hightower – background vocals
John Hobbs – piano
Jim Horn – baritone saxophone
Kim Keyes – background vocals
Troy Lancaster – electric guitar
Brent Mason – electric guitar
Terry McBride – acoustic guitar, background vocals
Greg Morrow – drums, percussion
Gordon Mote – Hammond B-3 organ
Duncan Mullins – bass guitar
Russ Pahl – steel guitar
Kim Parent – background vocals
Bill Payne – piano
Michael Rhodes – bass guitar
Charles Rose – trombone
John Wesley Ryles – background vocals
Scotty Sanders – steel guitar
Hank Singer – fiddle
Bryan Sutton – acoustic guitar, banjo, mandolin
Harvey Thompson – tenor saxophone
Scott Williamson – drums
Glenn Worf – bass guitar
Reese Wynans – piano, keyboards, Hammond B-3 organ

Choir on "Believe" and "Again"

Jovan E. Bender
Ashley Cromartie
Delva Dwana
DaJuana R. Elder
Danyelle Haley
Moiro Konchella
Erika Rowell
Meshia Sandifer
 Chris Smith
Andre Trice
Raymond Williams

Production
 Brooks & Dunn – producer (all tracks)
 Tony Brown – producer
 Mark Wright – producer ("My Heart's Not a Hotel")
 Doug Sax - mastering engineer

Chart performance

Weekly charts

Year-end charts

References

2005 albums
Brooks & Dunn albums
Arista Records albums
Albums produced by Tony Brown (record producer)